Sonepur or Sonapur may refer to:
 Sonpur, Bihar, town in Bihar, India
 Sonepur, Odisha, a town in Odisha, India
 Subarnapur District, district in Odisha, India
 Sonepur (Odisha Vidhan Sabha constituency), an assembly constituency of Odisha, India
 Sonepur State, former princely state of British India
 Sonapur, Assam
 Sonapur, Kosi
 Sonapur, Bheri
 Sonapur, Jhapa
 Sonpur, Nepal
 Sonapur, Dubai
 Sonapur, Bhandup
 Sonapur, Alipurduar